Morten-André Olsen (born 28 January 1979) is a retired Norwegian football goalkeeper.

He grew up in FK Bodø/Glimt and became a youth international; the club also produced the youth international goalkeepers Jonas Ueland Kolstad (born 1976) and Erling Bakkemo (born 1981). On senior level he joined FK Gevir Bodø in 1997. In 1999 he moved together with Gevir's head coach to FK Lofoten and featured in the 1. divisjon. Compulsory military service combined with family life caused career stagnation. He returned to Gevir ahead of the 2001 season, but the club went defunct and he instead joined Alta IF. In 2002 he played for Steigen SK, but moved to South Norway and Skien. After training with Pors he moved to Sandefjord in 2003, where he got 2 cup games, and Odd in 2004, where he made his debut in Eliteserien, playing 4 league games and 3 cup games.

References

1979 births
Living people
Sportspeople from Bodø
Norwegian footballers
Norway youth international footballers
FK Lofoten players
Alta IF players
Sandefjord Fotball players
Odds BK players
Norwegian First Division players
Eliteserien players
Association football goalkeepers